Shots may refer to:

Music

Albums
 Shots (Damien Dempsey album), 2005
 Shots (Ladyhawk album), 2008

Songs
 "Shots" (Imagine Dragons song), a 2015 single from the album Smoke + Mirrors
 "Shots" (LMFAO song), by LMFAO featuring Lil Jon from Party Rock
 "Shots", a song by Neil Young from Re·ac·tor

Sports
 Aldershot Shots, a speedway team
 Aldershot Town F.C., an association football club nicknamed The Shots

Other uses
 Shots (social network), a mobile app
 Shots, medical injections
 Shots, multiple servings of a shooter
 "Shots!!!", an episode of the animated series South Park
 Shots Studios, a Los Angeles-based media company

See also
 Shot (disambiguation)